The 1934 Utah Utes football team was an American football team that represented the University of Utah as a member of the Rocky Mountain Conference (RMC) during the 1934 college football season. In their 10th season under head coach Ike Armstrong, the Utes compiled an overall record of 5–3 with a mark of 4–2 in conference play, placed fifth in the RMC, and outscored all opponents by a total of 150 to 42.

Schedule

References

Utah
Utah Utes football seasons
Utah Utes football